The Empty Man is a 2020 supernatural horror film written and directed by David Prior in his feature directorial debut, based on Cullen Bunn and Vanesa R. Del Rey's graphic novel of same name published by Boom! Studios. The film stars James Badge Dale, Marin Ireland, Stephen Root, Ron Canada, Robert Aramayo, Joel Courtney, and Sasha Frolova. It follows an ex-cop who, upon an investigation into a missing girl, discovers a secret cult.

Originally filmed in August 2017 as an international co-production between the United States, South Africa, and France, the film received poor scores at test screenings and distributor 20th Century Fox lost faith in its commercial prospects. The final product, theatrically released in the United States on October 23, 2020, was still considered a rough edit by Prior. The film initially received mostly negative reviews from critics and audiences at the time of its release. It also grossed under $5 million worldwide against a $16 million budget. Reception improved after the film came out on home media and streaming services, and it has since gained a cult following.

Plot 
In the Ura Valley, Bhutan in 1995, four friends — Greg, Fiona, Ruthie, and Paul — go hiking on a mountain. Paul hears a strange whistling and falls in a crevice. Greg finds him in an almost catatonic state, staring at a massive and strange inhuman skeleton embedded into the cave wall. The group carries him out and take refuge at an empty house as a snowstorm hits. The next day, Ruthie is chased by the spirit of the creature in the cave. That night, Paul, slowly possessed by the evil spirit, whispers something into Ruthie's ear. The group later finds Paul next to the bridge they crossed. Ruthie becomes dazed before stabbing Greg and slicing Fiona's throat and throwing their bodies over the cliff. She shares an entranced look with Paul before throwing herself off too.

In Missouri 2018, former detective James Lasombra is grieving the death of his wife Allison and their son Henry who died in a car accident a year ago. He is friends with his neighbor Nora, a widowed single mother. Nora's daughter Amanda runs away and they find a message written in blood in the bathroom saying, "The Empty Man made me do it". Amanda's friend Devara reveals that Devara, Amanda and their friends were encouraged by Amanda to summon the Empty Man, a local legend.  To summon the Empty Man, you must first find an empty bottle on a bridge, blow into it, and then think of the Empty Man.  Each friend in the group did so.  The next day at school, Devara witnesses Amanda whispering into friend Brandon's ear, just as Paul had done to Ruthie in Bhutan.

James investigates the bridge, and finds the empty bottle.  He proceeds to blow on it, just as the teens had done previously. He goes underneath the bridge and discovers the hanged bodies of Brandon and the rest of Amanda's friends with the same message found in Amanda's bathroom. Devara is next killed by the spirit, who attacks her in the steam room of a spa with a pair of scissors. The police rule her death a suicide.

James researches the Pontifex Institute, discovering it is a cult that has beliefs originating from places like Bhutan and in tulpas, which he further researches on Wikipedia. He believes he hears the Empty Man that night and is besieged by nightmares. He travels to the institute and sits in on a talk by cult leader Arthur Parsons. Speaking to Parsons, he is alarmed at the leader's references to the Empty Man, claiming him to be an entity that provides his followers with what they want as long as they do his bidding.

James begins to think he sees the Empty Man. He follows cult members and investigates a cabin in the woods where he finds files on Amanda, her friends, Paul, and himself. He witnesses the cult performing a fire ritual but is spotted and pursued by the cult. He suspects that Amanda is now a member of the cult and informs Nora that she isn't safe. He takes Nora to a hotel to hide. It is revealed that the pair were having an affair and he was with Nora when Allison and Henry died.

Suffering from hallucinations, James ambushes cult member Garrett and asks him what is happening before brutally assaulting him. Garrett claims that there is a man in the hospital that the Empty Man is transmitting to the cult from. James discovers that the man is actually Paul, who is in a comatose state and regularly visited by cult members to get messages from the spirit. He finds Amanda in Paul's hospital room and she explains that Paul is dying from the strain of being the Empty Man, and that the cult needs a new vessel. She tells James he is a tulpa, a new vessel for the being, and that his memories and relationships were fabricated by her and the cult to ensure the deity's connection through his pain and loss. According to Amanda, James has only existed for a few days. In disbelief, James calls Nora, but she does not know who he is.

James breaks down and finds himself in a limbo-like dimension, where the entity enters his body. Back in the hospital, James executes Paul. He finds himself surrounded by several members of the hospital staff. They bow to him.

Cast

Production

Development 
On February 9, 2016, it was announced that 20th Century Fox acquired the graphic novel The Empty Man from Boom! Studios for a feature film, with David Prior hired to write and direct the film. The supernatural thriller film would be produced by Ross Richie and Stephen Christy. On July 7, 2016, it was announced that James Badge Dale was cast in the lead role as an ex-cop plagued by the violent deaths of his wife and son, who tries to find a missing girl. On September 27, 2016, it was announced that Aaron Poole was cast in the film to play Paul, an outdoorsy adventurer. The Empty Man was the last film to feature the original 20th Century Fox logo.

Design 
Creature designer Ken Barthelmey designed and sculpted the cave skeleton and other elements for the film. Prior hired him to work on the designs in 2016. Because the shooting schedule was close, Barthelmey had only a short amount of time to work on the designs. The main qualities Prior was looking for were "ancient age, authority, menace, and subtly more than human". Prior sent him paintings from Polish painter Zdzisław Beksiński and mentioned the Space Jockey in Alien for reference. Those inspirations eventually led Barthelmey to the film's final design. Barthelmey sculpted the cave skeleton in 3D. His model was 3D printed and built on set by production designer Craig Lathrop and his team.

Filming 
A majority of principal photography took place in South Africa in late 2016. During that final week, production halted due to poor weather conditions. During this time, Fox's executive vice president of production Mark Roybal left the studio. According to director David Prior, Roybal was "essential" towards the greenlighting of the film. Production resumed once a new executive was hired. Approved on a budget of $16 million, Prior said about $11 million was used on the shoot. The final week of production resumed in September 2017 in Edwardsville, Illinois, with some filming  done at the Madison County courthouse. Filming also took place at the Chain of Rocks Bridge and moved to another undisclosed location after three days.

Post-production 
When test screenings occurred, Prior was told to assemble a cut almost immediately after production had ended. Following low test scores, the studio began panicking over losing a tax rebate from South Africa due to impending deadlines. The producers assembled their own 90 minute version of the film (over 45 minutes shorter than Prior's original), which tested even worse. This led Prior to delivering his final cut of the film with six extra minutes (in which he would later consider it a rough edit in an interview) he initially intended to cut out.

Release 
The Empty Man was theatrically released on October 23, 2020, by 20th Century Studios (by mistake, the film was released under the 20th Century Fox banner despite the studio's name change on January 17, 2020). The film was originally scheduled for release on August 7, 2020, but was delayed to December 4 due to the COVID-19 pandemic, before being moved up to the October date following the shifting of Death on the Nile.

In the United Kingdom, the movie skipped a theatrical release entirely, instead being released on Disney+ via Star Hub and other VOD services on February 19, 2021.

Reception

Box office 
The Empty Man grossed $3 million in the United States and Canada, and $1.8 million in other territories, for a worldwide total of $4.8 million.

The film grossed $1.3million from 2,027 theaters in its opening weekend, finishing fourth at the box office. 53% of the audience was male, with 53% also being over the age of 25. Analysts blamed the film's low box office performance on the audience's initial assumption of another creepypasta-based supernatural teen horror film in the vein of movies like Slender Man and The Bye Bye Man, and zero marketing push from the studio, with social media analytics corporation RelishMix saying: "The campaign on social for 20th's The Empty Man dropped just one week ago on [October] 16. Any normal campaign for an indie, one-off high concept or awards contender will obviously drop at least two months out — at the latest." The film fell 57% in its second weekend to $561,000, then made $294,350 in its third.

Critical response 
The Empty Man was not screened in advance for critics upon its release, and initial reviews were mostly negative. Review aggregator Rotten Tomatoes reports that 77% of 26 critics have given the film a positive review, with an average rating of 5.8/10.

Barry Hertz of The Globe and Mail gave the film 2/4, writing: "Producers couldn't have picked a better title, though. After I left my Friday afternoon screening, attended by a whopping two other people, I felt far from satisfied. Empty, you might say." Writing for The Only Critic, Nate Adams gave it a "D−", summarizing that "running an overlong two hours and twenty minutes, The Empty Man – probably the bastard cousin twice removed from The Bye Bye Man or Slender Man, not good company – is a total bore".

Michael Gingold of Rue Morgue gave the film a positive review, saying it's "not at all the movie that its trailers are selling, and in this case, that's a good thing". Brian Tallerico of RogerEbert.com gave the film 2.5/4 stars and wrote that "every once in a while, a studio buries a project because they don't get it. How do you sell a film as surreal and unsettling as The Empty Man? You don't even try. If you're lucky, the audience finds it on their own."

Audience response 
Audiences polled by CinemaScore gave the film an average grade of "D+" on an A+ to F scale. PostTrak reported 42% of audience members gave the film a positive score, with "an awful" 25% saying they would definitely recommend it. According to several publications, the film had "the makings of a cult classic" and found second life in home media. The Film School Rejects wrote: "As happens with most cult movies, The Empty Mans audience has started to view the film's alleged weaknesses as its strengths."

Notes

References

External links 
 
 
 

2020 films
2020 horror thriller films
2020s English-language films
2020s supernatural horror films
20th Century Studios films
American horror thriller films
American supernatural horror films
American supernatural thriller films
Boom! Studios adaptations
South African horror thriller films
South African horror films
French horror thriller films
French horror films
English-language South African films
Films about altered memories
Films about cults
Films about death
Films about missing people
Films about parallel universes
Films based on American comics
Films directed by David Prior
Films postponed due to the COVID-19 pandemic
Films scored by Christopher Young
Films set in Bhutan
Films set in Missouri
Films shot in Illinois
Films shot in South Africa
Films with screenplays by David Prior
Live-action films based on comics
2020 directorial debut films
2020s American films
Cthulhu Mythos films